Acrocercops zopherandra is a moth of the family Gracillariidae. It is known from India (Bihar).

The larvae feed on Mallotus repandus. They probably mine the leaves of their host plant.

References

zopherandra
Moths described in 1931
Moths of Asia